Mojtame-ye Petrushimi Kermanshah (also Romanized as Mojtame`-ye Petrūshīmī Kermānshāh) is a village in Cham Chamal Rural District, Bisotun District, Harsin County, Kermanshah Province, Iran. At the 2006 census, its population was 279, in 10 families.

References 

Populated places in Harsin County